The Gilded Cage is a 1919 oil painting by Evelyn De Morgan. It was her final work before her death later in the year.

In the painting a woman looks out a window. Her outstretched hand forms a gesture of yearning as she watches a group of dancers and musicians. The principal figure among the travelling group is a woman who dances while holding her baby, suggesting that the scene also represents maternal duty. Broken jewelry and a book lay on the floor.

A bird soars free about the dancers, which contrasts sharply to the captive bird in the gilded cage hanging near the woman's distraught older husband.

References

Modern paintings
1919 paintings
Paintings in South East England
Paintings by Evelyn De Morgan
Birds in art
Dance in art
Musical instruments in art
Books in art